Parlor, Bedroom and Bath may refer to:

 Parlor, Bedroom and Bath (1920 film), an American silent comedy film directed by Edward Dillon
 Parlor, Bedroom and Bath (1931 film), an American pre-Code comedy film starring Buster Keaton